Llaqta Qulluy (Quechua llaqta place (village, town, city, country, nation), qulluy to die out, become extinct; to fail, "extinct town", also spelled Llaccta Ccolloy, Llacta Ccolloy, Llaqta Qolloy, Llactaccolloy) may refer to:

 Llaqta Qulluy, Acoria, an archaeological site in the Acoria District, Huancavelica Province, Huancavelica Region, Peru
 Llaqta Qulluy, Conayca, an archaeological site in the Conayca District, Huancavelica Province, Huancavelica Region, Peru
 Llaqta Qulluy, Tayacaja, an archaeological site in the Ahuaycha District, Tayacaja Province, Huancavelica Region, Peru
 Llaqta Qulluy, Vilca, an archaeological site in the Vilca District, Huancavelica Province, Huancavelica Region, Peru